This is a list of child actors from Australia. Films and/or television series they appeared in are mentioned only if they were still a child at the time of filming.

Current child actors (under the age of eighteen) are indicated by boldface.

A 
Daniel Amalm (born 1979)
Home and Away (1994–1996, 2000)

B 
Morgan Baker (born 1997)
Neighbours (2008–2015, 2017)
Jordana Beatty (born 1998)
Life Support (2002)
All Saints (2005)
Superman Returns (2006)
Home and Away (2007)
Legend of the Seeker (2009)
Judy Moody and the Not Bummer Summer (2011)
Charlotte Best (born 1994) 
Home and Away (2007–2009, 2010)
Andrew Bibby (born 1980)
Neighbours (1995, 1996–2001, 2005)
Brett Blewitt (born 1976)
My Two Wives (1992)
Neighbours (1993–1996, 2005)
Sally Boyden (born 1965)
Barnaby and Me (1977)
Lassie: A New Beginning (1978)
Dead Man's Float (1980)
The Little Dragons (1980)
Come Midnight Monday (1982)
Emily Browning (born 1988)
Lemony Snicket's A Series of Unfortunate Events (2004)
Dieter Brummer (1976–2021)
Home and Away (1992–1996)

C 
Ryan Clark (born 1983)
Home and Away (1991-2001, 2002, 2005)
Our Lips Are Sealed (2002)
White Collar Blue (2003)
Bondi Rescue (2006) 
The Black Balloon (2008)
Sasha Close (born 1973)
Neighbours (1987–1989)
Jamie Croft (born 1981)
Mighty Morphin Power Rangers: The Movie (1995)
Teagan Croft (born 2004)
 Home and Away (2016)
 Titans (2018)

D 
 Morgana Davies (born 2001)
 The End (2019)
 Storm Boy (2019)
 The Girlfriend Experience (2017)
 Devil's Playground (2014)
 The Hunter (2011)
 The Tree (2010)
Olivia DeJonge (born 1998)
Hiding (2015)
The Visit (2015)
Scare Campaign (2016)
Better Watch Out (2017)
Will (2017)
Stray Dolls (2019)
Josie & Jack (2019)
The Society (2019–present)
Elvis (2021)
Matt Doran (born 1976)
Home and Away (1991–1996)
The Thin Red Line (1998)
The Matrix (1999)
Star Wars: Episode II – Attack of the Clones (2002)
Macbeth (2006)
Next Door to the Valinskys (2008)
Battle of the Damned (2012)

E 
Anthony Engelman (born 1974)
Pugwall (1989–1991)
Indiana Evans (born 1990)
Snobs  (2003–2004)
Home and Away (2004–2008)

F 
Rhiannon Fish (born 1991)
Neighbours (2003–2005)
As the Bell Rings (2007–2009)
Amelia Frid (born 1975)Neighbours (1989–1991)

 G 
Nicholas Gledhill (born 1975)Careful, He Might Hear You (1983)Bodyline (miniseries) (1984)A Country Practice (1984)
Melissa George (born 1976)Home and Away (1993–1996)
Ben Guerens (born 1979)Neighbours (1990–1993)Body Melt (1993)

 H 
Anthony Hammer (born 1987)Neighbours (2001–2002)Bootleg (TV series) (2002)
Lauren Hewett (born 1981)Halfway Across the Galaxy and Turn Left (1991)Home and Away (1996, 1999)
Nicholas Hamilton (born 2000)Danger Close: The Battle of Long Tan (2019)

J
 Kaiya Jones (born 1996)
 The Saddle Club (2008–2009)
 Neighbours (2009–2014)

K
Angela Keep (born 1981)Hey Dad..! (1993–1994)Home and Away (1995)
Marny Kennedy (born 1994)Mortified (TV series) (2006–2007)The Saddle Club (TV series) (2008–2009)

L
Heath Ledger (1979–2008)Clowning Around (1995)Sweat (1996)Paws (1997)Home and Away (1997)Roar (1997)10 Things I Hate About You (1999)Two Hands (1999)The Patriot (2000)A Knight's Tale (2001)Monster's Ball (2001)The Four Feathers (2002)Ned Kelly (2003)The Order (2003)Lords of Dogtown (2005)The Brothers Grimm (2005)Brokeback Mountain (2005)Casanova (2005)Candy (2006)I'm Not There (2007)The Dark Knight (2008)The Imaginarium of Doctor Parnassus (2009)

 M
Indiana Massara (born 2002)
 Chicken Girls (2017–present)
 Attaway Appeal (2017)
Callan McAuliffe (born 1995)Flipped (2010)Cloudstreet (2011)I Am Number Four (2011)
Cleo Massey (born 1993)H2O: Just Add Water (2006–2010)
Levi Miller (born 2002)Pan (2015)Better Watch Out (2016)Red Dog: True Blue (2016)Jasper Jones (2017)American Exit (2019)
Maia Mitchell (born 1993)Mortified (2006–2007)Trapped (2008–2009)Castaway (2011)
Ryan Moloney (born 1979)Body Melt (1993)Neighbours (1994, 1995–2022)
Sarah Monahan (born 1977)Sons and Daughters (1986)Hey Dad..! (1986–1993)Home and Away (1995)

 O 
Fletcher O'Leary (born 1997)Neighbours (2007–2009)
Ed Oxenbould (born 2001)Julian (2012)Alexander and the Terrible, Horrible, No Good, Very Bad Day (2014)Paper Planes (2015)The Visit (2015)Better Watch Out (2016) The Butterfly Tree (2017) Wildlife (2018)

P
Mouche Phillips (born 1973)Playing Beatie Bow (1986)Princess Kate (1988)Dadah Is Death (1988)Home and Away (1989–1990)

 R 
Angourie Rice (born 2000)Black Mirror (2019)Spider-Man: Far From Home (2019)Every Day (2018)Jasper Jones (2017)The Doctor Blake Mysteries (2014)
Kate Ritchie (born 1978)Cyclone Tracy (1986)Home and Away (1988–2008)
Rebecca Ritters (born 1984)Neighbours (1992–1999, 2005)
Jordan Rodrigues (born 1992)Home and Away (2008–2009)Dance Academy (2008–2009)
Justin Rosniak (born 1977)Home and Away (1988, 1995)

 S 
Everlyn Sampi (born 1988)Rabbit-Proof Fence (2002)
Kristian Schmid (born 1974)Neighbours (1988–1992)The Tomorrow People (1992–1995)
Jansen Spencer (born 1981)Neighbours (1997–2001, 2005)
Jesse Spencer (born 1979)Neighbours (1994–2000, 2005)
Caitlin Stasey (born 1990)Neighbours (2005–2009)The Sleepover Club (2003, 2007)

 T 
Rod Taylor (1930-2015)The Time Machine (1960)One Hundred and One Dalmatians (1961) The Birds (1963)
Eliza Taylor-Cotter (born 1989)Neighbours (2003, 2005–2008)
Jiordan Anna Tolli (born 1994)Neighbours (1994–2001)
Jason Torrens (born 1975)Pugwall (1989)

 W 
Jeffrey Walkeer (born 1982)House Rules (1988)The Flying Doctors (1989)Pugwall (1991)Round the Twist (1993)Police Rescue (1993)Halfway Across the Galaxy and Turn Left (1994)Ocean Girl (1994–1997)
The Wayne Manifesto (1995–1997)
Thunderstone (1999–2000)
Matthew Werkmeister (born 1992)
Neighbours (2005–2011)
Tamsin West (born 1974)
Neighbours (1987–1988, 1991)
Round the Twist (1989)
Adam Willits (born 1972)
Home and Away (1988–1991, 1995–1996, 1997, 1998, 2000, 2002, 2003, 2008)

Y
Breanna Yde (born 2003)
The Haunted Hathaways (2013–15)
Santa Hunters (2014)
School of Rock (2016–18)
Escape from Mr. Lemoncello's Library (2017)
All I Want for Christmas Is You (2017)
Malibu Rescue (2019)

 
Lists of child actors by nationality
Child actors
Child actors